Heaven and Hell may refer to:
 Heaven and Hell

Literature
 Heaven and Hell (Swedenborg book), a 1758 book by Emanuel Swedenborg
 Heaven and Hell (Kardec book), an 1865 book by Allan Kardec
 Heaven and Hell (essay), a 1956 book by Aldous Huxley, sequel to The Doors of Perception
 Heaven and Hell (Jakes novel), a 1987 novel by John Jakes in the North and South trilogy
 Heaven and Hell, a 1981 play by Dusty Hughes
Heaven and Hell (Icelandic: Himnaríki og helvíti), a 2007 novel by Jón Kalman Stefánsson
 Heaven and Hell: My Life in the Eagles (1974–2001), a 2008 autobiography by Don Felder
 Heaven and Hell: A History of the Afterlife, a 2020 book by Bart D. Ehrman

Music
 Heaven & Hell (band), a band with members of Black Sabbath

Albums
 Heaven & Hell (Ava Max album)
 Heaven and Hell (Black Sabbath album), or the title song (see below)
 Heaven & Hell (Devolo album), or the title song
 Heaven & Hell (Joe Jackson album)
 Heaven & Hell (Meat Loaf and Bonnie Tyler album)
 Heaven & Hell (Shin Terai album)
 Heaven and Hell (Systems in Blue album), or the title song (see below)
 Heaven and Hell (Vangelis album), or the title song
 Heaven & Hell – A Tribute to The Velvet Underground, a series of albums

Songs
 "Heaven and Hell" (Easybeats song), 1967
 "Heaven and Hell" (Black Sabbath song), 1980
 "Heaven 'n Hell", a 1994 song by Salt-n-Pepa
 "Heaven and Hell" (Systems in Blue song), 2009
 "Heaven and Hell" (The Who song), 1970, also recorded by John Entwistle
 "Heaven and Hell", a song by Flower Travellin' Band from Made in Japan, 1972
 "Heaven and Hell", a song by C. C. Catch from Welcome to the Heartbreak Hotel, 1986
 "Heaven & Hell", a song by Circus of Power from Magic & Madness, 1992
 "Heaven & Hell" (Raekwon song), 1994
 "Heaven and Hell", a song by Annie from Don't Stop, 2009
 "Heaven and Hell", a song by Wisdom from Judas, 2011
 "Heaven and Hell", a song by Kanye West from Donda, 2021

Film and television
 High and Low (1963 film) (Tengoku to Jigoku, literally Heaven and Hell), a 1963 movie by Akira Kurosawa
 Heaven and Hell (film), a 1980 Hong Kong film produced by Shaw Brothers Studio
 "Heaven and Hell" (Cosmos: A Personal Voyage), an episode of Cosmos: A Personal Voyage
 "Heaven and Hell", an episode of Decoding the Past
 "Heaven and Hell", an episode of Mysteries of the Bible
 "Heaven and Hell" (Supernatural), an episode of the television series Supernatural
 Jeremy Clarkson: Heaven and Hell, a 2005 DVD by Jeremy Clarkson
 Heaven And Hell: North And South Book III, a 1994 television miniseries in the North and South TV miniseries trilogy

Video games
 Heaven and Hell (video game), a turn-based strategy video game

See also 

 The Marriage of Heaven and Hell, an 18th-century book by William Blake
 Heaven or Hell (disambiguation)
 Heaven (disambiguation)
 Hell (disambiguation)